Alaric may refer to:

People and fictional and legendary characters
Alaric (name), a Germanic name, including a list of people and fictional characters
 Alaric I (c. 370–410), king of Visigoths, who sacked Rome, and many Greek cities
 Alaric II (c. 458–507), king of the Visigoths
 Alaric and Eric, legendary kings of the Swedes

Other uses

, a British Royal Navy submarine